The Georgetown Market is an historic building constructed in 1865, on the site of a market dating to 1795.
It is located at 3276 M Street, Northwest, Washington, D.C., in the Georgetown neighborhood.

The Georgetown Corporation operated the market until incorporated into the District of Columbia. On Sept. 11, 1966, the Congress passed preservation legislation.

See also
 National Register of Historic Places listings in the District of Columbia

References

External links
 

Commercial buildings completed in 1865
Vernacular architecture in Washington, D.C.
Commercial buildings on the National Register of Historic Places in Washington, D.C.
Georgetown (Washington, D.C.)